Astyra was a town of ancient Aeolis near to Pergamon.

Its site is tentatively located near Kaplıca, Asiatic Turkey.

References

Populated places in ancient Aeolis
Former populated places in Turkey
Ancient Greek archaeological sites in Turkey